T-money or T-Money may refer to:

 T-money, series of rechargeable smart devices for transportation
 T-Money (rapper), past member of hip-hop group Original Concept
 T-Money, fictional character on Noah's Arc (TV series)
 T-Money, fictional character in The Search for Santa Paws and its sequel
 T-Money, nickname of Terry Crews on Battle Dome
 T-Money, nickname of Tarrell Wright on Storage Hunters

See also
 T. Money, nickname of American bass player Edward Tony Green
 JT Money, American rapper